Project DIANE, an acronym for Diversified Information and Assistance NEtwork, was a very early videoconferencing based community service network created in the United States. DIANE was a grassroots driven regional videoconferencing consortium which promoted and supported cooperative electronic alliances in education, community service, and economic development.

Created in 1992 in Nashville, Tennessee, Project DIANE was in active operation as a centrally managed public service network until 2006. Portions of the network still remain in service, however, though no longer under the Project DIANE moniker.

Peak network membership consisted of more than 200 participating organizations and more than 350 program and technical coordinators, supporting live interactive video programming over a service region consisting of twelve U.S. states and five countries.

History
Project DIANE was first proposed by Dr. Stephen P. Shao, Jr. in 1992 as a regional diversity development project collaboration between the U.S. Tennessee Valley Authority (TVA) and a small consortium of public and private universities located within TVA's six state service region.   At the time, Dr. Shao was employed as a business research center director at Tennessee State University in Nashville, Tennessee.  After a year of deliberations and two successful community based field pilots, Project DIANE was given startup funding by the TVA.

The two field  pilots, named the Nashville Pilot and the City Share Pilot were instrumental in demonstrating that videoconferencing technology was a viable and highly flexible mechanism through which to deliver a broad array of educational, economic development and public service resources to the general public. Both pilots were carried out with the participation of several dozen community service organizations, governmental agencies and corporations.

Primary sponsors and underwriters of the two pilots included TVA, BellSouth, IBM led by Steven Wilkinson, and PictureTel (later purchased by Polycom). The Nashville Pilot was an intracity test of desktop videoconferencing technology with application test sites in Nashville, Tennessee constructed at Tennessee State University, Cumberland Science Museum (later renamed the Adventure Science Center) and the Looby Public Library.

One month after conclusion of the Nashville Pilot, the City Share Pilot testbed was created by connecting the three Nashville video test locations to additional video sites constructed in Huntsville, Alabama. A large portfolio of community oriented and educational test applications between Nashville and Huntsville were launched with a 40-minute discussion of intercity cooperation between the mayors of the cities. It is believed that the City Share pilot was the first ever intercity videoconference link ever constructed for non-commercial purposes.

In the years following the project's pilot startup, many public and private organizations participated in the network's public service programming and donated both in-kind and financial resources.  Network participants and supporters were also successful in securing a wide bevy of public and private grants to pay for different types of community applications which utilized the project.

Overview

Project objectives 
Project DIANE's primary objectives were to: 
 develop a successful electronic community service network that could be expanded and/or replicated by all interested members of the community,
 bring education institutions, business development agencies, and community service organizations closer together for cooperative sharing of scarce public and private resources and
 provide needy individuals and groups with free, or low cost, digital access to useful information, assistance and professional expertise.

There were two notable aspects about the network. First, the project was designed as a broad-based, rather than niche-focused, community telecollaboration. DIANE membership reflected a wide spectrum of community organizations which came together online to jointly plan and carry out public programs and services.

The project was represented by most segments of the community, both in an organizational context (e.g., schools, community centers, libraries, business agencies, etc.) and individually (child through senior adult, families, disabled, urban and rural, etc.) DIANE was inherently a "project of projects" with teleconferencing applications in the three target areas of education, community service and economic development.

A second key aspect of this project was that, from its inception, DIANE members worked diligently to include disadvantaged or neglected members of society in consortium program development activities. The avoidance of a two-tier cyber-society of "haves" vs. "have-nots" was a high priority. DIANE members took special care to include low income inner city residents, developmentally disabled children, senior citizens, speech and hearing impaired individuals, and other potential information highway have-nots in program development activities.

Participants 
Online members of the consortium included family and community centers, speech & hearing treatment centers, K-12 schools, zoos, museums, public libraries, universities, language institutes, skill training centers, chambers of commerce, economic development agencies, healthcare groups, overseas military bases & dependents schools, and other service organizations.

Specific notable members of the project included the Small Business Administration sponsored Small Business Development Centers, the Tennessee Foreign Language Institute, the Adventure Science Center, Vanderbilt University, the Tennessee Foreign Language Institute, Tennessee League for the Deaf & Hard of Hearing, the Nashville Zoo, the Metropolitan Action Commission, Urban League of Nashville, the Boys & Girls Club, the Girl Scouts of Middle Tennessee, the Catholic Diocese of Nashville, the Tennessee State Library & Archives, the Elephant Sanctuary of Hohenwald, the Nashville Public Library System, the Bank of America Small Business Resource Centers, and the U.S. Department of Defense Overseas Dependents School System.

Real-time telecollaboration 
Telecollaboration was inherently the method by which DIANE organizations educated and assisted one another. Real-time telecollaboration took place in all project activities through two-way electronic exchanges between a resource provider (such as a K-12 teacher, college professor, business counselor, social worker, therapist, or other expert professional) and a person in need (e.g., student, small/minority business entrepreneur, researcher, family member, disabled person, senior citizen, etc.). Real-time multimedia information exchanges occurred during videoconferences via electronic whiteboards, remote application sharing, electronic messaging, hi-speed file transfer and other means.

Programs and applications 
DIANE's program portfolio included various independent and inter-dependent telecollaborations, offering resources and assistance to both mainstream and disadvantaged community segments. In addition to the general program descriptions given in this section, interested parties were able to click to the Project DIANE Directory and read the "DIANE Program & Resource Profile" for each individual organization. General teleconference based program areas established by the project included: the Economic Development Partnership, Tennessee Child Development Partnership, Teachers' Teleconferencing Curriculum Forum, Internet Distance Training, Global Community Project, and others.

Examples of specific program activities within these general program areas included the following: The Tennessee League for the Hearing Impaired offered videoconferencing-based Deaf culture workshops, sign language instruction, and translation services. Looby Metro Public Library supported a distance mentorship program called "Adopt-a-Grandparent" in which senior citizen library volunteers provide guidance and counseling to disadvantaged youth who called in from DIANE's community center locations. Therapists and physicians at the Bill Wilkerson Speech & Hearing Center and the Vanderbilt Child Development Center electronically assisted disabled children, including adolescents with autism and related communication disorders. High school students and teachers regularly consulted online with the project's educational resources such as the Cumberland Science Museum (e.g., for science information, environmental workshops, etc.) and to Meharry Medical College (e.g., to learn about viruses), etc.

Electronic field trips 
The use of videoconferencing technology to electronically and interactively take students to exotic and faraway places was pioneered by Project DIANE.  An important supplement to in-class instruction, schoolchildren frequently were able to go on electronic field trips through the DIANE network for meaningful interactive real-world learning experiences.

The Nashville Zoo conducted videoconferences with area schools to bring students safe interactive experiences with rare snow leopards and other wild animals. Animal conservationists from the Elephant Sanctuary in Lewis County, TN provided teleconference-based seminars on elephants and the need for animal preservation, even connecting video callers to remote cameras located in the elephant grazing pasture. Radnor Lake State Natural Area offered students a wide range of teleconference activities involving environmental conservation, water ecology, and wireless video/underwater camera views of its wildlife residents.

Often, Project DIANE electronic field trips took the children to international locations such as France, England, Japan, or to meet interesting people such as jet pilots, film actors and corporate executives. The Tennessee Foreign Language Institute conducted world culture seminars and foreign language instruction to DIANE participants, also providing students remote playback access to its 250+ international tape library. Tennessee's state information repository, the Tennessee State Library & Archives, provided interactive teleconference-based history seminars, library reference assistance, and live curator based video access to its rare manuscript collection, includes original American Civil War photographs, historic architectural drawings, original letters of President Andrew Jackson, the 1796 Tennessee State Constitution, etc.

Connecting students to experts outside the classroom 
Connected schools and community centers teleconferenced with the local public library for story telling hour and puppet shows, with NationsBank's Small Business Resource Center and the Nashville Area Chamber for youth career planning and entrepreneurship programs, and with Meharry Medical College for health and hygiene workshops. An advanced placement (AP) course shared curriculum was being developed for use by area high schools. Current AP course development included environmental science and biology.

Regarding business development programs, any area business with compatible technologies could access Project DIANE's online economic development member agencies, including SBRC business experts, SBRC library resources, SBDC business counselors, area chamber of commerce program personnel, university business faculty, etc.

Awards and recognitions 
International recognitions of Project DIANE included: Polycom Corporation's Exceptional Content Provider Award (8/03), a Top 5 Rating by the European Commission's Global Bangemann Challenge (Stockholm, 6/99); 6 NII Global Information Infrastructure award citations (12/96-2/98) including an AT&T Special Telecollaboration Award; a "national success story" citation by the President's National Information Advisory Council (2/96), and an Awards Laureate designation by the Smithsonian Institution Information Technology Awards Program (6/95).

Key invited presentations and demonstrations of Project DIANE programming include national conferences and forums hosted by the American Library Association (Atlanta, GA, 6/02), National Science Foundation (Berkeley, CA, 12/00), U.S. Dept of Commerce (Washington DC, 4/98) and the White House (Philadelphia PA, 4/97).

Technology evolution 
Project DIANE began as an all Integrated Services Digital Network (ISDN) BRA based community network using desktop personal computers deploying an H.320 codec, which later evolved into a hybrid switched digital and Internet IP based H.320/H.324 platform. The videoconferencing equipment used by Project DIANE in the Nashville and City Share startup field pilots were all OS/2 based videoconference units (PCS/1s) provided through a joint development partnership at the time between PictureTel and the IBM Corporation. These early video units were replaced during the startup phase with Windows OS-based PC desktop units.

In later years, the project's infrastructure also included a large number of set top videoconference units, as well as several dozen videoconferencing units for conference rooms.  In the late 1990s, a large corporate donation of more than a hundred new videoconference units more than doubled the size of DIANE to more than two hundred video locations.

Project DIANE also later acquired a Tandberg Multipoint Control Unit (MCU), sometimes referred to as a video bridge or gateway, which allowed the network to deliver its interactive programming to up to 16 separate locations simultaneously. Funding for the MCU's required network connections (a Primary Rate Access high speed digital telephone line and an IP broadband access line) was provided by Tennessee State University and the Tennessee Department of Human Services, Rehabilitation Services Division.

See also 
 History of virtual learning environments
 Videotelephony

References 
Notes

Bibliography

Project DIANE presentation and live demonstrations, Catholic Diocese Conference, Nashville, Tennessee, August 3, 2002
Project DIANE Workshop, American Library Association Annual Conference, Atlanta, Georgia, June 13–19, 2002
Project DIANE Videoconferencing Techniques Presentation, Region 3 Financial and Administrative Conference, Co-Sponsored by Florida Agency for Workforce Innovation and U.S. Dept of Labor, Renaissance Orlando Resort at SeaWorld, Orlando, Florida, May 21–24, 2002 (forthcoming)
Project DIANE Presentation, Distance Education Conference sponsored by the Institute for the Integration of Technology in Education, Roxbury Community College, Boston, Massachusetts, February 11, 2002
Vanderbilt Medical Center LEND Program Site Visitation Report - Section on Project DIANE, Maternal and Child Health Bureau, U.S. Department of Health & Human Services, January 17, 2002
Science and Technology Education  Partnership (STEP) Newsletter - Section on Project DIANE, Issue 2, Vanderbilt University, January 2002
"Project DIANE Receives $1.1 Million Community Technology Grant", ComputerUser, January 2002, page 12
"Stoner Creek Among Recipients of DIANE Grant", Lebanon Democrat, December 21, 2001, page 25
"Project DIANE Grant", Mount Juliet News, December 19, 2001, page 8
"TSU Videoconference Project Gets $1.1 Million" - Project DIANE by Michael Cass, Tennessean, December 14, 2001, page 2B
"Tennessee's Deaf Service Centers Launch Network Under Project DIANE Umbrella" by Scutt Communications Services, League for the Deaf & Hard of Hearing News Release, December 13, 2001
, Nicole Troutman, The City Paper, November 29, 2001, page 5
, Metropolitan Nashville Public Schools, November 16, 2001
, Jennifer Patterson Lorenzetti, eSchool News, October 24, 2001
"Project DIANE Combines Technology, Education" by William Williams, The City Paper, August 24, 2001, page 8
"Technology Day Project DIANE Learning Demonstrations", FootNotes: Friends of Nashville Public Library Newsletter, June 2001, page 3
, Laura Sewell, American Profile: Celebrating Hometown Life, May 19, 2001
, Hearing Impaired Host, Bella Online Inc.: The Voice of Women on the Web, Los Angeles, California, May 18, 2001
"Project DIANE Overview and Distance Education Activities",  Visual Collaboration Workshop, Mid-Thames Institute of Management,  Slough, England,  March 14, 2001
 Interactive video presentation on Project DIANE,  Eighth Annual Distance Education Conference (DEC2001), Texas A&M University, Austin, Texas,  January 23–26, 2001
 "Electricity, Circuits and Batteries" - Project DIANE program flyer, Tennessee Energy Education Network (TEEN) publication, Tennessee Department of Economic and Community Development, January 2001
 "Take an Electronic Field Trip" - Sections on Project DIANE, Industry Solutions Publication - 2nd Edition, PictureTel Corporation, Fall 2000/Winter 2001
 "Curriculum Planner & Field Trip Guide" - Section on Project DIANE, Cumberland Science Museum/ Sudekum Planetarium 2000-2001 publication, page 4
 , presentation and workshop, Building Partnerships in Science and Industry Conference, sponsored by National Science Foundation, Radisson Hotel - Berkeley Marina, Berkeley, California, December 7–8, 2000
 Is Videoconferencing for You? A Project DIANE presentation and testimonials from area metro school teachers and Vanderbilt Virtual School, Tennessee Educational Technology Conference 2000 (TETC 2000), sponsored by the Tennessee State Department of Education, Nashville Convention Center, November 30, 2000
 Overbrook School Academics Guidebook - Section on Project DIANE, Overbrook School publication, Nashville, TN, Winter 2000
 , Educational Technology Solutions: Success Stories, published by BellSouth Corporation, 2000
 Red Shield Family Initiative Information Brochure - Section on Project DIANE, published by the Salvation Army, Winter 2000
 Project DIANE workshop co-presentations,  2 hour group workshop presentation, Sessions 106–206, Third Annual Tennessee Education Technology Association Summer Institute 2000 Proceedings, John Overton High School, Nashville, TN  July 19, 2000
 "Project DIANE Overview", invited presentation, Videoconferencing Workshop for Metro Teachers, Wyatt Building, Room SR 130, Virtual School Program, Vanderbilt University, July 17–18, 2000
 "Synchronous Training & Project DIANE Overview", invited presentation to Tennessee Training Collaboration Committee, Tennessee Voices for Children et al., July 6, 2000
 "Distance Education Program Development & Issues: Project DIANE", invited video presentation, Massachusetts Corporation for Educational Technology/PictureTel "Educate the Educator" Distance Learning Summer Institute, Andover, Massachusetts, June 29, 2000
 Vanderbilt Virtual School to (Co-)Sponsor Videoconference for Students" - Project DIANE, Vanderbilt News Releases, VU Division of Media Relations, April 28, 2000
 "Program & Service Guide" - Section on Project DIANE,  Nashville Urban League Publication, April 2000
 MIND Training Project - Section on Project DIANE, Mid-Tennessee Interdisciplinary Instruction in Neurodevelopmental Disorders (MIND), funded by U.S. Maternal & Child Health Bureau, published by John F. Kennedy Center, Vanderbilt University in collaboration with Tennessee State University et al., Winter 2000
 A Window to the World: Video-Teleconferencing Takes Kids on Virtual Field Trip, Susan Passi-Klaus, Tennessean, February 28, 2000, page 4B
 "Project DIANE Brings Teleconferencing to Radnor Lake and Tennessee Schools" by Leslie Anne Rawlings, Radnor Lake Reflections Newsletter, Winter 2000, pages 1–2
 "Live Connections: Tools for Achievement, Safety, Teachers and Communications" - Project DIANE Profile, BellSouth Publication, Atlanta, GA, December 1999, page 8
 "Out of the Pen and Into the Open" - Section on Project DIANE by Gail King, Wall Street Journal, November 30, 1999, page A24
 "Technology Enhancing Education" - Project DIANE by Adrienne Outlaw, Nashville Public Radio, WPLN FM 90.3 Nashville and WHRS FM 91.7 Cookeville, 10 minute program broadcast, November 22, 1999
 "Project DIANE: A Working Model for Developing a Low Cost Community Development Interactive Video Network",  presentation by Steve Shao and Garrett Harper, HBCU/MI Educational Technology Expo '99 Conference: Emerging Technologies: Reshaping Contemporary Education, Marriott Marquis, Atlanta, Georgia, November 21–23, 1999
 , Vanderbilt University Virtual School news release, November 1999
 , Vanderbilt University Virtual School, October 1999
 "SBA Students Participate in Project DIANE Cyberforums", Clairvaux, SBA Quarterly, Summer 1999 Issue, page 7
 "Project DIANE: Distance Education And So Much More" by Karen R. Haigney, Government Video Magazine, Volume 10, No. 9, August 1999, pages 93–94
 "A Place to Grow" program brochure - Section on Project DIANE, Edgehill Community Center Inc. Publication, Nashville, TN, May 1999
 "Red Shield Family Initiative Begins to Take Shape" - Section on Project DIANE by Laura Currie, Issues Magazine, published by the Junior League of Nashville, Volume 4, No. 1, Spring 1999, pages 22–23
 , Vanderbilt University Virtual Schools, April 1999
 VCH Programs and Services, Vanderbilt Children's Hospital, Revised Publication, April 1999
 Electronic Field Trip Sites - Sections on Project DIANE, Martha's Vineyard Regional High School, Oak Bluffs, Massachusetts, 1999
 Symposium Features Utilizing Video Conferences in Ulster County - Section on Project DIANE,  Hudson Valley Business Journal, New York, March 15, 1999
 Connecting Arizona's Enterprise Communities - A Strategic Plan and Resource Guide for Telemedicine and Internet Connections" - Section on Project DIANE, Alison Hughes, MPA, Rural Health Office and Arizona Telemedicine Program, University of Arizona
 , Matt Oster and Paul King, PhD, Vanderbilt University Medical Center, March 1999
 The Global Bangemann Challenge, Information Society Activity Center (ISAC) of the European Commission, administrated by the City of Stockholm, Sweden, March 1999
"Multimedia Forums" - Film Story on Project DIANE, a broadcast program sponsored by Nippon Telephone and Telegraph (NTT), Channel 3, Japan Public Television (NHK), January 22, 1999
"Implementing Distance Learning" - Section on Project DIANE, MarkIntel Market Research Reports, Faulkner Information Services, The Investext Group, January 1, 1999, page 5
, Rebecca Kelly, Wilmington College, Delaware, December 1998
 , Francisco Manuel García Ortiz", Florida Centre de Formacio, Spain, 1998
 "School's Out" - Section on Project DIANE by Mary Gotschall, NASDAQ Magazine, December 1998, pages 44–46
 "Take an Electronic Field Trip" - Sections on Project DIANE, Industry Solutions Publication, PictureTel Corporation, Winter 1998
 "Kids Taking Electronic Field Trip Debut on Japanese TV" - Project DIANE by Lisa Battles, Mount Juliet News, Thursday, November 26, 1998, page 1
 "DIANE Allows Kids to Go on Japan TV" by Jennifer Horton, Lebanon Democrat, November 19, 1998, page 1
 "Creating Ways to Connect Students and Business - Project DIANE" by A. Bilton-Ward and M. Young, Exemplary Applications of Videoconferencing in Education, a report published by the Center for Occupational Research and Development, Waco, Texas, 1998, 54 pp.
 Project DIANE Brings Videoconferencing to Tennessee Schools, Technological Horizons in Education (T.H.E.) Journal, Volume 26, Number 4, November 1998, page 40
 "Going Global? Teleconferencing Assistance Available for Tennessee Companies Interested in Exporting" - Project DIANE, Return On Investment, Nashville Area Chamber of Commerce, October 1998
 Elephant '98 Show Opening Preview Kicks Off Tennessee's Asian Elephant Awareness Month" - Section on Project DIANE, News Release, Press Network, October 1998
 , Office of University and Science Education, Oak Ridge National Laboratory, Oak Ridge, Tennessee, September 1998
 Classroom to Serve 2 Masters" - Section on Project DIANE, Tanya N. Ballard, Tennessean, Wilson Today Supplement, September 6, 1998, page 1 (for a copy of this article, see the Northern Lights electronic library collection)
 , 12th Annual Technology & Learning Conference, Special Workshop Presentation - Technology Leadership Network, National School Boards Association, Vanderbilt University Rotunda, October 28, 1998
 Net Surfers Can Find Sanctuary with the Elephants, K. Dawn Rutledge-Jones, Nashville Business Journal, July 10–16, 1998, page 6
 "Elephants Coming to Library by way of Teleconference" - Project DIANE by Carrie Ferguson, Tennessean, June 19, 1998, page 2
 "What is Project DIANE?", Manufacturing Matters, a publication of the Chattanooga Manufacturers Association, June 1998
 Project DIANE Technology Showcase Planned May 19, Vanderbilt University News Release, May 14, 1998
 "Project DIANE Reception", Return On Investment, Nashville Area Chamber of Commerce, May 1998
 , Research Paper, University of Houston, Spring 1998
 Project DIANE Prepares Students for Nashville Shakespeare Festival, Tennessee Performing Arts Center, April 14, 1998
 , Liz Johnson and Stephen Shao, Mid-South Instructional Technology Conference, Technology in the Learning Process: Evolution and Revolution, Middle Tennessee State University, Murfreesboro, Tennessee, April 5–7, 1998
 , Saint Bernard Academy, Nashville, Tennessee, 1998
 "PMS Students "Visit" with Senator Frist"- Project DIANE by Cindy Kelly, The Review Appeal, March 11, 1998, page D3
 VUMC Joins National Teleconference, Vanderbilt Register, March 8, 1998
 Local Community Networking Group Attends National Conference, Diane Long, Tennessean, March 3, 1998, page 7B
 , Return on Investment, Nashville Area Chamber of Commerce, March 1998
 "Connecting All Americans for the 21st Century" - Project DIANE presentations and live demonstrations, Telecommunications Links in Low Income and Rural Communities Conference, sponsored by United States Department of Commerce and the Public Utility Law Project (PULP), J. W. Marriott Hotel, Washington, DC, February 24–27, 1998
 , Andrew Pergam, Johns Hopkins University, Baltimore, Maryland, February 1998
 "Technology Uplifts Society" - Project DIANE workshop, 25th Annual Meeting of WATTec, sponsored by the University of Tennessee at Knoxville and the Knoxville-Oak Ridge Regional Network, Hyatt Regency Hotel, Knoxville, Tennessee, February 16–18, 1998 (forthcoming)
 "Project Paragon Takes SBA Further on Information Superhighway"- Section on Project DIANE, Tennessee Register, February 9, 1998, page 5
 , Tennessee Performing Arts Center
 , Prepared for the National Foundation for the Improvement of Education, Dr. David Moursund, Principal Investigator, International Society for Technology in Education, January 1998
 , PictureTel Users Group Conference, PUG Monitor, Vol. 6, No. 1, January 1998, coordinated by the Mid-Hudson Regional Computer Center, New Paltz, New York
 "Have a Very, Merry Videoteleconferencing (VTC) Christmas" - Project DIANE Virtual Santa Program, The White Falcon, Iceland Defense Force Newsletter, United States Navy, Public Affairs Office, New Year's Week 1997/98 Issue
 , Page High School Media Center, Franklin Tennessee
 How Should High Schools Integrate the Internet into their Curriculum?" - Section on Project DIANE, Aya Aravani, Science Learning Center, University of Michigan, Ann Arbor, Michigan
 "Expansion is Under Way", "Summer Teleconferencing", Sections on Project DIANE, Trunklines, Volume 3, No. 4, December 1997, pages 1, 4
 "Teleconferencing Future Trends and Project DIANE", presentation and live demonstrations, Governor's Economic Summit: Tennessee Tuned-In To Tomorrow, sponsored by Tennessee Governor's Office, Opryland Hotel, Nashville TN, October 29–31, 1997
 NeighborhoodLink:  Community Network for Cleveland's Inner City" - Section on Project DIANE, Mary Ellen Simon, Proceedings of the Families,  Technology, & Education  Conference,  Edited by Anne S. Robertson, October 30 - November 1, 1997,  December 1998
 The Technology Corner - Project DIANE, SBA News, Sept/Oct 1997, page 7
 Promising Practices Database - Project DIANE, California Distance Learning Project, California Department of  Education, Sacramento CA, November 1997  (or )
 Harpeth River Environmental and Educational Project" - Section on Project DIANE, Williamson County Board of Education, October 1997
 Educational Videoconferencing Directory - Sections on Project DIANE, 2nd Edition, Center for Occupational Research and Development, Virtual Teaching Network, 1997
 "Peek in on Life of Elephants" - Project DIANE, Tennessean, September 29, 1997, page 4B
 "Heaven and Hohenwald Have Elephants" - Project DIANE  by Theresa Jensen Lacey, Tennessee Register, September 8, 1997, pages 9 and 17
 , Government Technology, Volume 10, Number 8, August 1997, page 74
  and also , United States National Information Infrastructure Virtual Library
 The Power to Transform: Learning Solutions - Project DIANE Applications Overview Publication, PictureTel Corporation, June 1997
 , American Chamber of Commerce Executives (ACCE), June 1997
 "Visit the Sanctuary! (Without Driving to Hohenwald)" - Project DIANE, Trunklines, Volume 2, No. 3, Elephant Sanctuary Newsletter, June 1997, page 5
 Project DIANE Live Demonstrations, coordinated by Janet Pride and Judy Butler, National Educational Computing Conference, Washington State Convention & Trade Center, Seattle Washington, June 30-July 2, 1997
 "Project DIANE  at Elephant Sanctuary" - Lewis County Chamber of Commerce Pilot,  Lewis County Herald, June 19, 1997
 "Project DIANE Overview" presentation by Garrett Harper, Toward Sustainable Development:  Successful Communities of the '90s, 37th Annual ACCRA Conference, Renaissance Hotel, Cleveland Ohio, June 12–14, 1997
 "SBA Flexes Hi-Tech Stuff at Summit" - Project DIANE, Tennessee Register, June 2, 1997, page 6
 ISDN Based Distance Learning Solutions Survey Report" - Sections on Project DIANE, National Taiwan Normal University
 Project DIANE & NetworkMCI  Multipoint Video Demonstrations and Presentation, DVC '97 West Desktop Video Communications Conference & Exhibition, San Jose Convention Center, San Jose, California, May 19–22, 1997
 , Robert Bellinger, Electronic Engineering Times, Issue 953, May 12, 1997
 NationsBank Small Business Resource Center: A Free Resource Library for Entrepreneurs, Web Entrepreneur Magazine, May 1997
 "Project DIANE Reception", Green Hills News, April 1997
 Bell Atlantic, NYNEX Sponsor 16 Charities At Presidents' Summit for America's Future" - Section on Project DIANE, Bell Atlantic News Release, April 28, 1997
 "Project DIANE Selected to Participate in Presidents' Summit for America's Future Conference", Lewis County Herald, April 24, 1997
"DIANE Will Show Off at Conference", Tennessean, April 23, 1997, page 8B
 GII Awards Winners and Finalists Honored at Presidents' Summit for America's Future, Global Information Infrastructure Awards, April 22, 1997
 "Project DIANE Reception" by Larry McCormack, Nashville Banner, April 10, 1997, page D4
 "A Report on MMJ Region Four's Manufacturing Assistance Pilot", Manufacturing Means Jobs Initiative Research Report, March 1997
 Presentation and Live Project DIANE Demonstrations, 7th Annual International Distance Learning Conference (IDLCON), sponsored by United States Distance Learning Association, Washington DC, March 24–26, 1997
 Project DIANE Live Demonstrations and Exhibit Booth, 1997 Tennessee Library Association Conference, Renaissance Hotel and Nashville Convention Center, March 12–14, 1997
 "Business Community Networking - The DIANE Project", 16th Annual Office Systems Research Association Conference, Loews University Plaza, Nashville, Tennessee, February 27-March 1, 1997
 "DIANE Offers High Tech Ways to Enhance Learning" by Joan Anderson, Tennessee Register, Volume 60, Number 3, February 10, 1997, page 13
 "SBA Beams in French Lessons with Far Out Program"- Project DIANE by Joan Anderson, Tennessee Register, Volume 60, Number 3, February 10, 1997, page 12
 "HOT Links Classroom to Stage" - Project DIANE by Kay Hodge, Review Appeal, January 31, 1997, page C1
 "Page, Centennial Students to See 'Miss Saigon' Thanks to Project DIANE" by Ryan Underwood, Williamson A.M. Tennessean, January 28, 1997, page 4F.
 Minority Health Professions  Schools Telemedicine Assessment Report" - Sections on Project DIANE,  on behalf of the  National Library of Medicine by Neal Neuberger, Health Tech Strategies & John Scott, Center for Public Service Communications, January 1997
 , Dr. Edwin S. Gleaves, Tennessee State Library & Archives, January 10, 1997
 Diversified Information and Assistance Network (DIANE), Community and Telecollaboration Finalist Lists, National Information Infrastructure Awards (NII) Program, December 1996
 , On The Road to Economic Development - A Guide for Continuing Education Programs at Historically Black Colleges and Universities, U.S. Department of Education, Office of Educational Research and Improvement, December 1996,
 Metal Work Manufacturers to Take Virtual R&D Tour, Tennessee Department of  Economic and Community Development News Release, November 1996
 "The Elephant Sanctuary : A Peaceful New Place" - Project DIANE, Friends of Animals, Georgia Chapter, Fall 1996
 "Page Students Join in Teleconference" - Project DIANE, The Review Appeal, Franklin, Tennessee, November 22, 1996
 "CBS Cameraman Films Science Class" - Project DIANE and Elephant Sanctuary, The Monday Memo, November 18, 1996
 "Project DIANE Takes Learning Beyond Classroom Walls", White House Paper, Nashville Dominican Campus Quarterly Report, Fall '96 Issue
 "Business Expo '96 - Tuned in to the Future" - Project DIANE Exhibit, Return on Investment, Nashville Area Chamber of Commerce, November 1996
 Personal Videoconferencing - Sections on Project DIANE, by Evan Rosen, Manning/Prentice-Hall Publishers, 1996, pages 114, 245, 250, 258, 266, 282
 THRAB Long Range Strategic Plan- Goal IV Section on Project DIANE, Tennessee Historical Records Advisory Board, October 1996
 "Experience the World: Visit Project DIANE Booth at Business Expo", Return on Investment, Nashville Area Chamber of Commerce, October 1996
 Editorial - Community Learning Networks, Lifelong learning and Branding by Peter J. Bates, Editor
 , September 2, 1996  or  Sheffield Hallum University's web site.  In the same issue, see also the editorial foreword , by the editor Peter J. Bates
 "World eyes Nashville through Internet - Project DIANE Visitors", Return on Investment, Volume 7, Number 8, Nashville Area Chamber of Commerce, August 1996
 Project DIANE Presentation and Live Demonstrations, "The View from the Top" Conference, Tennessee School Superintendents, Tennessee Executive Development Program, Sponsored by Tennessee Department of Education, BellSouth Economic Development Center, Nashville TN, May 7–8, 1996
 "Residents Now Have Computer Link to MAC" - Project DIANE by Aissatou Sidime, Tennessean Close Up, May 1, 1996, page 4
 "TFLI Joins Project DIANE", The Accent, Tennessee Foreign Language Institute Quarterly, Volume V, Issue 3, Summer 1996
 Tennessee Information Infrastructure Project Status Report for January 1 to March 31, 1996" - Section on Project DIANE, report submittal of Tennessee Department of Economic and Community Development to Telecommunications and Information Infrastructure Assistance Program, US Department of Commerce
 "Virtual Classroom is a Mouse Click Away" - Project DIANE, The Chronicle of Mt. Juliet, Volume 16, Number 22, March 27, 1996
 "World at Students' Fingertips" - Project DIANE by Brent Andrews, The Lebanon Democrat and Wilson County News, Volume 108, Number 60, March 25, 1996, page 1
 Presentation and Live Project DIANE Demonstrations, 6th Annual International Distance Learning Conference (IDLCON), sponsored by United States Distance Learning Association, Hyatt Regency Crystal City, Washington DC, March 19–21, 1996
 Mary Claire Scanlon Article Critique - Section on  Project DIANE, English Composition Board, University of  Michigan, March 17, 1996
 "Chambers of Commerce in the 21st Century: New Roles and Perspectives" - Section on Project DIANE, presentation by Garrett Harper and Stephen Shao, 19th Annual Conference of the Southern Future Society, Hermitage Hotel, Nashville TN, March 14–16th 1996
 McKinsey Report: Connecting K-12 Schools to the Information SuperHighway, Chapter on  Libraries, Community Centers and Community Networks - Section on Project DIANE,  A Report prepared for the National Information Infrastructure Advisory Council (NIIAC), McKinsey & Company, Inc, Palo Alto, California, March 18, 1996
 "Telecommunications in Tennessee, A Watershed" - Section on Project DIANE, Tennessee Public Service Commission Final Report, March 1996
 "Project DIANE: A National Success", Accent, February/March 1996
 "Elephant Sanctuary Joins (DIANE) Network ", Lewis County Herald, February 15, 1996, page 1
 "A Strategic Plan for Belfast to Become a Leading Information City of the 21st Century, Consultative Draft" - Section on Project DIANE, Strategic Plan of  the InfoCity Consortium and the Belfast City Council, February 6, 1996
 "Presidential Panel Endorses DIANE", Return on Investment, Volume 6, Number 2, Nashville Area Chamber of Commerce, February 1996
 "Bill Wilkerson Center's Speech and Language Department Joins Project DIANE", Communicator, Fall/Winter 1995/96 Issue
 Diversified Information and Assistance NEtwork, Highway One, A nonprofit democratic technology organization sponsored by AT&T, Apple Computer, IBM and others, Washington DC
 "Project DIANE Connects Sister Cities" - Nashville's New Sister City Belfast, Northern Ireland, Return on Investment, Volume 6, Number 1, Nashville Area Chamber of Commerce, January 1996
 , Mary Claire Scanlon, Electronic School, National School Boards Association, January 1996
 "Saint Bernard Moves to Forefront of Technology Race" - Section on Project DIANE, Tennessee Register, January 1, 1996, page 12
 "Kickstart Initiative - Connecting America's Communities to the Information Superhighway" - Section on Project DIANE, Final Annual Report of the United States Advisory Council on the National Information Infrastructure, February 1996
 "Off the Record - Virtual Santa" - Section on Project DIANE by Beth Stein, Nashville Banner, December 13, 1995, page B1
 "The DIANE Project", 1995 Information Systems Management Conference Proceedings, sponsored by Tennessee State Government, University of Tennessee Conference Center, Knoxville, Tennessee, December 5–8, 1995
 Instant Replay - Project DIANE, Return on Investment, Volume 5, Number 11, Nashville Area Chamber of Commerce, November 1995
 , Chamber Executive, Volume 22, Number 9, American Chamber of Commerce Association, October 1995
 "Project DIANE Reception", Vanderbilt Register, October 23–29, 1995
 "TSU Forms Child Development Partnership with VUMC", Accent, October/November 1995, page 4
 "Vanderbilt and TSU Form On-Line Partnership for Child Development", Tennessee Tribune, October 20–26, 1995, page 13  (for a copy of this article, see the Northern Light Special Document Collection)
 , Ann Marie Deer Owens, Vanderbilt Register, October 9–15, 1995
 "VU and TSU Form On-Line Child Development Partnership", Nashville Pride, October 8, 1995
 "Vanderbilt, TSU Program to Bring High-Tech Help to Special Needs Children", Nashville Business Journal, October 2–6, 1995, page 8
 "Access the World Through Project DIANE" - Project DIANE, Return on Investment, Business Expo Convention Center Supplement, Nashville Area Chamber of Commerce, October 1995
 "Project DIANE Reaches Out to Kids", Return on Investment, Nashville Area Chamber of Commerce Newsletter, Vol.5, No. 3, October 1995
 "DIANE Project", Small World, Friends of the Children's Hospital, Vanderbilt University Medical Center Newsletter, Fall 1995
 "Diversified Information & Assistance Network (DIANE) Project", presentation by Marva Nettles, Garrett Harper, Kate Sauermann and Stephen Shao, Technology in All Instructional Settings Conference Proceedings, sponsored by the Tennessee Board of Regents, Crown Plaza Hotel/South Central Bell Building, October 2–3, 1995
 "VU, TSU Join in Technology Initiative" - Project DIANE, Vanderbilt Hustler, September 26, 1995
 "Project DIANE", Moving Video to Center Stage: 4th Annual PictureTel User Group National Conference Proceedings, Sheraton Music City Hotel, Nashville TN, September 10–13, 1995
 "Tennessee Child Development Partnership Formed", Return on Investment, Nashville Area Chamber of Commerce Newsletter, Vol.5, No. 2, September 1995
 Tennessee Profile - Section on Project DIANE, The Chronicle of Higher Education Almanac Issue, September 1, 1995, page 95
 Tennessee Information Infrastructure Meeting Minutes - Section on Project DIANE, TNII Community Network Task Force, August 23, 1995
 "Technology Key to Attracting Business - Chamber Technology and Research Update: Project DIANE", Return on Investment, Nashville Area Chamber of Commerce, Vol.5, No. 1, August 1995
 "DIANE Comes to Tennessee", SETA News, Southeastern Telecommunications Association, Vol.2, No. 2, July 1995, page 5
 DIANE Live Demonstrations & Exhibits, Family Reunion IV Conference: The Family & The Media, moderated by Vice President Al Gore, address by President Bill Clinton, sponsored by Tennessee Select Committee on Children and Youth, Tennessee General Assembly, Tennessee Performing Arts Center, Nashville TN, July 9–19, 1995
 "Free from Tennessee" - Project DIANE, Baltimore Business Journal, June 30-July 8, 1995, page 21
 Preliminary Report to TNII Steering Committee - Section on Project DIANE, TNII Higher Education Research Task Force, June 23, 1996
 "Project DIANE Implementation Issues", Distance Learning Desktop Implementation Panel, ITCA '95 Conference Proceedings, International Teleconferencing Association, Washington DC, June 13–16, 1995
 Smithsonian Institution Collection on Information Technology Innovation - section on Project DIANE, Computerworld Smithsonian Awards Laureate, National Museum of American History, June 1995
 "Project DIANE Overview" by Barry Blumberg, Interactive Networking Symposium, Sponsored by International Technology Research Inc, Enoch Pratt Free Library and Morgan State University Research Center, Baltimore MD, June 7, 1995
 "DIANE: Diving Into a New Era" by Anna Lynn Little, The Tributary, Spring 1995, Vol., Issue 2, page 5
 "Inner City Access: Network Focuses on Nashville's Poor and Disadvantaged (Online in the City)" - Project DIANE by Goldie Blumenstyk, The Chronicle of Higher Education, Vol XLI, No. 35, May 12, 1995, page A23
 Medical ISDN Applications - Section on Project DIANE, BellSouth Corporation News Releases, May 3, 1995
 , April 26, 1995
 Diversified Information and Assistance Network (DIANE) and also here, National Information Infrastructure, U.S. Dept of Commerce, April 1995
 "New Atlas Takes Regional Perspective", Nashville Business Journal, April 17–21, 1995, page 11
 "Project DIANE Links Chamber to Information Highway", Return on Investment, Published by the Nashville Area Chamber of Commerce, Vol.4, No. 4, April 1995
 {{Cite web |url=http://www.midnet.sc.edu/gold/diane.htm |title=Project DIANE", Community Networking Conference Proceedings' |access-date=2011-03-22 |archive-url=http://webarchive.loc.gov/all/20061003041030/http://www.midnet.sc.edu/gold/diane.htm |archive-date=2006-10-03 |url-status=dead }}, Sponsored by MidNet and the University of South Carolina, Columbia SC, April 7–8, 1995
 "River Project & Project DIANE: Electronic Field Trips" by Judy Butler, Rita Mott and Stephen Shao, Proceedings of the 12th Annual Tennessee Educational Technology Conference Proceedings, Sponsored by Tennessee Department of Education, Opryland Hotel, Nashville TN, March 12–15, 1995
 Project DIANE ISDN Network Demonstrations, North American ISDN Users Forum Proceedings, Co-Sponsored by National Institute of Standards & Technology and BellSouth Corporation, Tennessee Economic Development Center, Nashville TN, February 28-March 1, 1995
 "DIANE Opens Worldwide Classroom to SBA Students" by Frank Ritter, Tennessee Register, February 27, 1995, page 3
 "Students Explore Far Away Places Without Leaving the Classroom" - Project DIANE by Frank Ritter and Ann Betts, Tennessean Close Up, February 22, 1995, page 4
 "Community Network Collaborations" - Project DIANE, Community Network Panel, Celebration of Distance Learning Conference, Sponsored by Tennessee Education Technology Association Chapters, South Central Bell Building, February 21–22, 1995
 "Students Make Virtual Visit to the Zoo" - Project DIANE by Dana Pride, Nashville Banner, February 13, 1995
 "Computer Links Encourage Student-Expert Interactions" - Project DIANE by Catherine Trevison, The Tennessean, February 5, 1995, page 6B
 , Michael Brookes, Ph.D. Thesis, Deakin University, School of Management Information Systems, Victoria, Australia, 1995–99
 Project DIANE is a Virtual Community Net,  Communications News, February 1995,
 "The Future is Here!" - Project DIANE, The Current, Vol. 1, No. 3, January/February 1995
 "DIANE Project Connects Schools to World" by Kristi Walker, Brentwood Journal, January 25, 1995, page 1
 "Groups at Community Centers Dancing Together by Way of Computer" by Wendy Kurland, Tennessean Close Up, November 30, 1995, page 3
 "Mustafa's Dancing Thrills Two Groups" - Project DIANE, Tennessean Close Up, November 2, 1994, page 4
 "Center Will Help Create Minority Opportunities" - Project DIANE by David Flaum, Memphis Commercial Appeal, October 27, 1994, page B1
 "DIANE Project Brings Multimedia Terminals Online" by Cyrus Afzali, Nashville Business Journal, October 17–21, 1994, page 20
 "FYI Tennessee, The First 4 Years: A Review, Status Report, and Updated Projection Report" - Section on Project DIANE, published by the Tennessee Public Service Commission, October 1994
 "Region's Economic Diversity on Display at Business Expo'94" - Project DIANE, Nashville Business Journal, October 10–14, 1994, page 3
 "Multimedia Teleconferencing for Small Business Development", Workshop Presentation, 1994 Chamber Business Expo, Nashville Convention Center, October 12–13, 1994
 "Chamber of Commerce, Project DIANE Sponsoring Telecommunications Project", The Ledger, Nashville Banner, October 10, 1994, page 5
 "Business Expo Video Conferencing" - Project DIANE, The Nashville Record, October 6, 1994
 "Multimedia Network Expands in Tennessee and Alabama" - Project DIANE, Communications Industries Report, Vol.11, No.9, International Communications Industries Association, September 1994, page 31
 "Project DIANE Service Network", Business Without Boundaries - MCI Virtual Network Users Conference Proceedings, Scottsdale, Arizona, September 12–14, 1994
 "DIANE Project Overview", ITCA '94 Conference, Loews Anatole, Dallas, TX, International Teleconferencing Association Proceedings, June 20–22, 1994
 "Amazing Things Happen When High Speed Switched Digital Lines Connect Computers" - Project DIANE, MCI Customer Newsletter 120%, July 1994
 "NationsBank Small Business Center" - DIANE Project, Community Reinvesting, July 1994
 "Computer Lets People Talk To, See Each Other" by Kevin Pollard,Tennessean Close Up, June 1, 1994
 "Observation Deck"- Project DIANE by Vince Vittore, America's Network'', May 15, 1994, page 6
 "Telemedicine Putting Rural Areas On-Line to Care" - Project DIANE by Judy Holland, Nashville Banner, May 9, 1994, page B4.
 "Network Providing People a New View Via Computer Linkup" by Kevin Pollard, Tennessean Close Up, May 4, 1994, page 6
 "Information Highway - Project DIANE" by Betsy Ketsdever, Dimensions of Integrating Video and Literacy Instruction, International Reading Association SIG Newsletter, April 1994
 "Education & Community Service Networking"- Project DIANE, ISDN in Education Conference, Nashville Convention Center, Nashville TN, March 14–16, 1994
 "High Tech Highway" - Project DIANE by Tonya Kennedy, Special Information Superhighway Supplement, Nashville Banner, March 28, 1994
 "Computer Network" - Project DIANE by Rodney Eubanks, Covington Leader, March 2, 1994
 "High Tech Sharing Helps Students, Businesses and the Community" - Project DIANE by Stephen Shao, The Tennessean, February 6, 1994
 "Network Promotes Universal Access" - Project DIANE by Jim DiLorenzo, Telephony, February 14, 1994
 "Poor Need On-Ramp to Info Age" - Project DIANE by Tonya Kennedy, Nashville Banner, February 3, 1994
 A Report on the DIANE Project's City Share Pilot, November 1993, 63 pages
 "Music City and Rocket City Linked Through ISDN Project" - Project DIANE by Commissioner Keith Bissell, Tennessee Public Service Commission Newsletter, August 1993
 "Edgehill Youngsters Catch a Glimpse of Future at TSU" - Project DIANE by Norma White, Metropolitan Times, page 22, August 17, 1993
 "Reaching Out with a Network" - Project DIANE by Ed Gregory, The Tennessean, August 8, 1993
 "The DIANE Project: An Overview", ISDN User, Vol. 7, No. 3, July/August 1993
 "The DIANE Project's Nashville Pilot", ISDN User, Vol. 7, No. 3, July/August 1993
 "Technology Makes Idea from The Jetsons A Reality" - Project DIANE by Reagan Walker, The Tennessean, page 4B, July 24, 1993
 "A&M, Tennessee State Share Computer Network" - Project DIANE by Phillip Taylor, Huntsville Times, July 16, 1993
 "Tennessee State U. Computer Project Test Variety of Community Services" by David Wilson, The Chronicle of Higher Education, March 3, 1993 (http://www.chronicle.com/)
 A Report on the DIANE Project's Nashville Pilot, February 1993, 42 pages
 "Pushing State's High-Tech Buttons" by Stephen Shao, Taking Stock in Tennessee, Special Tennessean Report, page 29, February 7, 1993
 "DIANE Project Explores Learning Technologies" by Azizuddin Nasir, Metropolitan Times, January 31, 1993
 "DIANE Project to Create Educational, Business Link" by Rhonnda Kerr, Nashville Business Journal, November 23–27, 1992
 "Chamber of Commerce, TSU Push for Data Network" by Joe Hall, Nashville Business Journal, September 28-October 2, 1992
 "DIANE Project an Aid to Small Business Owners" by Rhonnda Kerr, Nashville Business Journal, November 23–27, 1992
 Project DIANE Testimony, Tennessee Public Service Commission Hearings on Integrated Services Digital Network, Nashville, Tennessee, November 4, 1992

Assistive technology
Information technology in the United States
Videotelephony
Telecommunication services
Teleconferencing